Dwight Dean Collins (born August 23, 1961) is a former American football wide receiver in the National Football League (NFL). He was drafted by the Minnesota Vikings in the sixth round of the 1984 NFL Draft, and played one season for them in 1984. 

Collins played college football at Pittsburgh.  In his 1980 freshman season, Collins played on a Pitt team that included eight other future NFL players: Rickey Jackson, Dan Marino, Russ Grimm, Jimbo Covert, Bill Maas, Hugh Green, and Tim Lewis.  Collins led the team in receiving that year with 30 receptions for 827 yards and 10 touchdowns.  He totaled 133 receptions for 2,264 yards and 24 touchdowns in his four college seasons.

References

1961 births
Living people
American football wide receivers
Pittsburgh Panthers football players
Minnesota Vikings players
Sportspeople from Rochester, New York